Out There is an album by Eric Dolphy which was released by Prestige Records in September 1961. It features Dolphy in a quartet with bassists Ron Carter (here playing cello) and George Duvivier, and drummer Roy Haynes. It was Dolphy's second album as a leader, released following his time with Charles Mingus.

The album features four original compositions by Dolphy, one of which is a collaborative effort with Mingus. The album also features three covers, "Eclipse" by Mingus, "Sketch of Melba" by Randy Weston and "Feathers" by Hale Smith. The cover features a painting by Richard Jennings, known as "Prophet".

Dolphy's group on Out There resembles the late 1950s ensembles of Chico Hamilton, with whom Dolphy played and recorded during that time, in that it features both a cello and a bass; however, unlike Hamilton's group, Dolphy's does not contain a guitar or other chordal instrument. As a result, Dolphy and Ron Carter solo over bass and drums only, helping to give the album a freer, more open sound when compared to Dolphy's previous album, Outward Bound, which featured pianist Jaki Byard. On the other hand, the presence of the cello lends the album a chamber music feel.

"Eclipse" from this album is one of the rare instances where Dolphy solos on B clarinet. Out There is one of Carter's earliest appearances on record.

Reception
The contemporaneous DownBeat reviewer identified an improvement in Dolphy's bass clarinet playing and described him as "one of the few uncliched flute players in jazz". Reviewing the album for AllMusic, Michael G. Nastos noted the presence of "a depth and purpose that were unprecedented and remain singularly unique," and states that "[t]he music reveals the depth of [Dolphy's] thought processes while also expressing his bare-bones sensitive and kind nature." He concluded: "Out There explores Dolphy's vision in approaching the concept of tonality in a way few others -- before, concurrent, or after -- have ever envisioned." In a review for the BBC, Peter Marsh wrote: "Throughout, the instrumental combinations throw up beautiful clashes and consonances... There's a sense of a proper Third Stream being mined here, and it says much for Dolphy's vision that such combinations are still the stuff of surprise 40 odd years later. While Out There is neither the compositional masterwork of Out to Lunch or the improvisational firestorm of the Five Spot sessions with Booker Little of the following year, it's nevertheless a worthy record of one of the most innovative jazz musicians ever to have walked the planet."

Writing for PopMatters, Will Layman called the album "a dream come true", and noted how Dolphy and Carter are "free to explore harmony above the minimal barriers of George Duvivier's bass lines and Roy Haynes' snap-crackle-pop stick work." According to Layman, "'17 West' is irresistible, with the boys playing playful unison, then the flute grooving while the cello plays a hip double-stop figure in counterpoint." Regarding "Eclipse", he wrote: "there is a wonderful classical vibe as the strings play as an ensemble behind the leader. Then, as Dolphy plays a stately melody, Carter plays a wide-ranging improvisation around him. It's a rare example of a jazz musician finding a new way to package a tune other than the usual melody-solos-melody format that was tired even in 1960."

Track listing
 "Out There" (Eric Dolphy) – 6:55
 "Serene" (Dolphy) – 7:01
 "The Baron" (Dolphy) – 2:57
 "Eclipse" (Charles Mingus) – 2:45
 "17 West" (Dolphy) – 4:50
 "Sketch of Melba" (Randy Weston) – 4:40
 "Feathers" (Hale Smith) – 5:00

Personnel
 Eric Dolphy — alto saxophone (#1, #7), bass clarinet (#2, #3), B-flat clarinet (#4), flute (#5, #6)
 Ron Carter — cello
 George Duvivier — bass
 Roy Haynes — drums

References

1961 albums
Eric Dolphy albums
New Jazz Records albums
Albums recorded at Van Gelder Studio
Avant-garde jazz albums
Post-bop albums
Albums produced by Esmond Edwards